Khachen or Seyidbeyli is a village that is, de facto, in the Askeran Province of the breakaway Republic of Artsakh; de jure, it is in the Khojaly District of Azerbaijan, in the disputed region of Nagorno-Karabakh. The village has an ethnic Armenian-majority population, and also had an Armenian majority in 1989.

Toponymy 
The village was known as Seyidishen during the Soviet period.

History 
During the Soviet period, the village was a part of the Askeran District of the Nagorno-Karabakh Autonomous Oblast.

Historical heritage sites 
Historical heritage sites in and around the village include the 12th/13th-century Kachaghakaberd Fortress in the mountains to the west, a 12th/13th-century khachkar, the 13th-century St. Stephen's Church, the 13th/14th-century monastery of Ptkes Berk, an 18th-century village, and the 19th-century St. John's Church.

Economy and culture 
The population is mainly engaged in agriculture and animal husbandry. As of 2015, the village has a municipal building, a house of culture, a secondary school, a kindergarten and a medical centre. The community of Khachen includes the village of Urakhach.

Demographics 
The village had 369 inhabitants in 2005, and 332 inhabitants in 2015.

Gallery

References

External links 
 
 

Populated places in Askeran Province
Populated places in Khojaly District